SU-4 may refer to:

Sukhoi Su-2#Variants
SU-4 - GAZ-A truck fitted with 76mm recoilless gun, 1932-1940